Jack Dyer Crouch (October 22, 1915 – Jan 11, 1990) was an American entrepreneur and conglomerate organizer.

Early life
He was born in Columbia, Missouri.

Career
Crouch co-founded the Hyatt Hotel chain in 1954 with his partner  Hyatt Robert von Dehn, and later became a Hilton Hotel franchise owner in the United States.

He is credited with conceptualizing and building the world's first fly-in (airport) hotel, The Hyatt House Los Angeles.

Prior to that, Crouch owned "Jack's on the Strip" in Hollywood, one of the first drive-through restaurants in California. It was there that he would meet von Dehn, who would soon invest in his airport-hotel concept.

Personal life
Crouch had four sons, J. Richard Crouch, Jack Dyer Crouch, II, Robert Crouch and Michael Crouch; and two daughters, Cathy Crouch and Michelle Crouch.

His son Jack Dyer Crouch II is a former Assistant Secretary of Defense, U.S. Ambassador to Romania, Deputy National Security Adviser, and Assistant to the President. Also, from 1993 to 2001, Crouch was associate professor of defense and strategic Studies at Southwest Missouri State University. He was member of the board of editors of Comparative Strategy and a member of the board of advisers of the Center for Security Policy. While at Missouri, he also served as a reserve deputy sheriff in Christian County.

References

See also

 List of American restaurateurs
 List of entrepreneurs
 List of people from Columbia, Missouri
 List of people from Los Angeles

Place of death missing
1915 births
1989 deaths
20th-century American businesspeople
American company founders
American hoteliers
American restaurateurs
Businesspeople from Los Angeles
Hotel founders
Hyatt people
Businesspeople from Columbia, Missouri